Walter Dinnie (26 December 1850 – 7 May 1923) was a New Zealand police commissioner, private detective and land board chairman. He was born on 26 December 1850.

References

1850 births
1923 deaths
New Zealand police officers